Berenguer Gombau (died 1551) was a Roman Catholic prelate who served as Bishop of Calvi Risorta (1544–1551).

Biography
On 27 October 1544, Berenguer Gombau was appointed by Pope Paul III as Bishop of Calvi Risorta.
He served as Bishop of Calvi Risorta until his death in 1551.

References

External links and additional sources
 (for Chronology of Bishops) 
 (for Chronology of Bishops) 

16th-century Italian Roman Catholic bishops
1551 deaths
Bishops appointed by Pope Paul III